Tang Lingling (born 8 March 1987) is a Chinese karateka. She is a two-time silver medalist at the Asian Games in 2014 and 2018. In both finals she lost against Guzaliya Gafurova of Kazakhstan. She is also a bronze medalist at the World Karate Championships.

She won one of the bronze medals in the women's kumite +68 kg at the 2010 Asian Games held in Guangzhou, China.

In 2013, she won the gold medal in the women's 68 kg event at the 2013 Asian Karate Championships held in Dubai, United Arab Emirates. She also won the silver medal in the women's team kumite event.

References

External links 
 

Living people
1987 births
Place of birth missing (living people)
Chinese female karateka
Karateka at the 2010 Asian Games
Karateka at the 2014 Asian Games
Karateka at the 2018 Asian Games
Medalists at the 2010 Asian Games
Medalists at the 2014 Asian Games
Medalists at the 2018 Asian Games
Asian Games medalists in karate
Asian Games silver medalists for China
Asian Games bronze medalists for China
21st-century Chinese women